JHL may refer to:

Junior Hockey League (Russia)
JHL, the IATA airport code for Fort MacKay/Albian Aerodrome
JHL, the Public and Welfare Services Union of Finland
JHL, the John Hay Library